Macquartia is a genus of flies in the family Tachinidae.

Species
M. chalconota (Meigen, 1824)
M. dispar (Fallén, 1820)
M. grisea (Fallén, 1810)
M. hystrix Mesnil, 1972
M. macularis Villeneuve, 1926
M. nudigena Mesnil, 1972
M. praefica (Meigen, 1824)
M. pubiceps (Zetterstedt, 1845)
M. tenebricosa (Meigen, 1824)
M. tessellum (Meigen, 1824)
M. viridana Robineau-Desvoidy, 1863

References

Tachininae
Tachinidae genera
Taxa named by Charles Henry Tyler Townsend